Die a Legend is the debut studio album by American rapper Polo G. It was released on June 7, 2019, by Columbia Records. It features his US top 20 single "Pop Out" featuring Lil Tjay, as well as the sequel to the track titled "Pop Out Again" featuring Lil Baby and Gunna. The songs "Finer Things", "Battle Cry" and "Deep Wounds" were also released prior to the album. The album received acclaim from music critics.

Promotion
The album was announced May 26, 2019 through his Instagram. The following week, the track listing was revealed.

Critical reception

The album received acclaim from critics upon release. Sheldon Pearce of Pitchfork rated the album 8.3 out of 10, and gave it the "Best New Music" award. In his review, he stated that Polo G "blends pop and drill with ease and delivers a standout Chicago street rap debut that is meticulously crafted and honestly told". Riley Wallace of HipHopDX said "There is a beautifully crafted blend of honesty and tragedy within [Die a Legend]". HipHopDX users gave a unanimous review of a perfect 5/5 for the album.

Commercial performance
Die a Legend debuted at number six on the US Billboard 200 chart, with 38,000 album-equivalent units in its first week, becoming Polo G's first top-ten album. In its second week, the album dropped to number seven on the chart, earning 29,000 album-equivalent units. In its third week, the album dropped to number ten on the chart, earning 24,000 album-equivalent units that week. On August 11, 2020, the album was certified Platinum by the Recording Industry Association of America (RIAA) for combined sales and album-equivalent units of over 1,000,000 units in the United States.

Track listing
Credits adapted from Tidal.

Notes
  signifies a co-producer
 "Through da Storm" features vocals by Leia Monroe.

Personnel
Credits adapted from Tidal.

Technical
 Ayo – recording engineer (tracks 1, 2, 3, 7, 8. 12, 13), mixing engineer (track 8), mastering engineer (track 8)
 Todd Hurtt – recording engineer (tracks 3, 9, 10, 11)
 Eric Sandoval – recording engineer (track 4)
 Denly Morisset – recording engineer (tracks 5, 14), mixing engineer (tracks 5, 14)
 Luis Bordeaux – recording engineer (tracks 5, 14)
 Jahmere Taylor – recording engineer (track 6)
 Jordan Knight – recording engineer (track 6)
 Baruch "Mixx" Nembhard – mixing engineer (tracks 1–4, 7, 9–13)
 Eric Lagg – mastering engineer (tracks 1–7, 9–14)

Charts

Weekly charts

Year-end charts

Certifications

References

Polo G albums
2019 debut albums
Columbia Records albums